Amnon Buchbinder (June 17, 1958 - November 30, 2019) was an American-born Canadian screenwriter and film director, most noted for his feature films The Fishing Trip and Whole New Thing.

Born in Missouri, he moved to Canada with his family in childhood, before studying film at the California Institute of the Arts. He was based in Vancouver in the early 1980s, where he was a board member of the Pacific Cinematheque and a programmer for the Vancouver International Film Festival. He made a number of short films, most notably 1983's Oroboros, before studying directing at the Canadian Film Centre. He joined the faculty of York University as a professor of screenwriting in the film department in 1995, and eventually became chair of the department.

The Fishing Trip, his first feature film as a director, was written by Michelle Lovretta, one of his students at York. In 2005 he published the screenwriting text The Way of the Screenwriter, and released Whole New Thing as his second feature film.

Following Whole New Thing he worked on Mortal Coil, a television pilot. Although it was never picked up to series, he published a novel based on it in 2014. In 2015 he released the film Traveling Medicine Show, a compilation of three short docufiction films in which he and his own family had played fictionalized versions of themselves. The following year he released his final film, the interactive documentary Biology of Story.

He died on November 30, 2019 of cancer.

References

External links

1959 births
2019 deaths
20th-century Canadian screenwriters
20th-century Canadian male writers
21st-century Canadian screenwriters
21st-century Canadian novelists
21st-century Canadian male writers
Canadian male novelists
Canadian male screenwriters
Film directors from Toronto
Writers from Toronto
American emigrants to Canada
Jewish Canadian writers
Academic staff of York University
Canadian Film Centre alumni
Jewish Canadian filmmakers